Citizen Band may refer to:

 Citizens band radio
 Citizen Band (music band)
 Citizen (band)